is a district of Shibuya, Tokyo, Japan.

As of October 2020, the population of this district is 1,860. The postal code for Uguisudanichō is 150–0032.

Education

 operates public elementary and junior high schools.
All of Uguisudanicho is zoned to Sarugaku Elementary School (猿楽小学校), and Hachiyama Junior High School (鉢山中学校).

References

Neighborhoods of Tokyo
Shibuya